Canberra Sport Awards or CBR Sport Awards were originally established in 1984 by the Board of ACT Sports House. From 1984 to 2014 they were referred to as ACT Sportstar of the Year Awards and organised by ACTSPORT. The ACT Government took over the Awards after ACTSPORT ceased operations in 2015 and renamed them Canberra Sport Awards. There were no Awards in 2015 due to the transition from ACTSPORT to ACT Government.

Inductions to the ACT Sport Hall of Fame are part of the annual Awards.

Major Awards 1984-
Several Awards - overall athlete and coach were not continued in Canberra Sport Awards. Rising Star replaces Junior Athlete.

Awards 2016- 
Awards established for Canberra Sports Awards.

Discontinued Awards
These ACTSPORT Awards have not been continued by the Canberra Sports Awards. The AIS Award was selected from athletes on scholarship at the Australian Institute of Sport campus in Canberra. In 2014, there was no AIS Award as the AIS no longer offered athlete scholarships. In its place, the Harry Marr Award was created and Patrick Millss was its inaugural and only recipient.

Canberra News (1972-1973) and Canberra Times had an annual award called the Sports Star of the Year.

References

External links
CBR Sports Awards Official Site
ACTSPORT Sports Star Awards 1984-2014

Australian sports trophies and awards
Sport in Canberra
Awards established in 1984
1984 establishments in Australia